Beasts of Burden is a comic book series created by writer Evan Dorkin and artists Jill Thompson and Benjamin Dewey, and published by American company Dark Horse Comics. The title centers on an eponymous team of intelligent animals that investigate different paranormal events that occur in their small neighborhood of Burden Hill. The initial group consists of five dogs and a cat. They are often seen consulting with "Wise Dogs", local shamanic elders of their community.

Publishing history
The characters made their first appearance in a story titled Stray (written by Evan Dorkin with art by Jill Thompson) in The Dark Horse Book of Hauntings. They made subsequent appearances in The Dark Horse Book of Witchcraft, The Dark Horse Book of the Dead, and The Dark Horse Book of Monsters.

Dorkin stated that he came up with the concept after being asked by Dark Horse editor Scott Allie to write a story for the horror anthology The Dark Horse Book of Hauntings.

In 2009 the characters appeared in their own four-issue miniseries. The following year the characters appeared alongside Hellboy in a one-shot crossover issue titled Hellboy/Beasts of Burden: Sacrifice. Three new Beasts of Burden short stories appeared in the fourth, sixth, and eighth issues of the relaunched Dark Horse Presents series during 2011 and 2012, all of which were later reprinted in the Beasts of Burden: Neighborhood Watch one-shot. The publishing schedule slowed down after that with only two issues from 2013 to 2017.

Late 2017, Dorkin wrote on his blog that Thompson was almost finished with the first issue of a two-part story, The Presence of Others, and artist Benjamin Dewey was working on a four-issue story titled Wise Dogs and Eldritch Men. Dorkin confirmed on his Twitter account that more stories were planned for both Thompson and Dewey. In 2019, The Presence of Others was published with Jill Thompson on the first issue and Benjamin Dewey on the second, and the Occupied Territory four-issue miniseries with Benjamin Dewey was published in 2021.

Characters

The Apprentices
 Ace, a Husky, courageous and bitten by a werewolf in "A Boy and His Dog"
 Jack, a Beagle, has some sensitivity to the paranormal
 Pugsley, a Pug, who is outspoken, snarky and cynical, often gets told to shut up by the others
 Rex, a Doberman, who is often afraid
 The Orphan, a male orange tabby cat who is ownerless. He is the only non-canine to attend dog funeral services. He possesses street smarts.
 Whitey, a Jack Russell Terrier who has a tendency to vomit or wet himself when frightened
 Dymphna, a former witch's familiar introduced in The Unfamiliar
 Miranda, a black dog who can cast spells

The Swifties
A gang of neighbourhood cats that work with the apprentices introduced in "Something Whiskered This Way Comes" and as allies in "The Presence of Others".

 The Get Away Kid, ownerless tuxedo cat with a reputation for escape
 Muggsy, a calico cat who is a "first lifer" (a cat that hasn't used up any of its nine lives)
 Sleeping Bob
 Johnny Whiskers

Wise Dogs
 Cian
 Emrys, an Old English Sheepdog
 Lundy, a Scottish Terrier
 Dempsey
 Brigid

Other characters
 Red, a dog
 Holstein, a cat

Comics

Collected editions

Film
A CG-animated film adaptation was announced via Reel FX Creative Studios with filmmaker Andrew Adamson scheduled to produce and writer Darren Lemke attached to write the screenplay. On February 20, 2013, it was announced that Shane Acker would direct the film, with Mike Richardson and Aron Warner joining Adamson as producers.

In April 2021, Evan Dorkin revealed that this adaptation never moved beyond pre-production and that he was not a fan of the script that would have been used. No further adaptation plans have been announced.

Awards and recognition
 2004 Eisner Awards: Won Best Painter/Multimedia Artist (Interior Art)
 2005 Eisner Awards: Won Best Short Story
 2007 Eisner Awards: Won Best Painter/Multimedia Artist (Interior Art)
 2010 Eisner Awards: Won Best Painter/Multimedia Artist (Interior Art)
 2010 Eisner Awards: Won Best Publication for Teens
 2010 Harvey Awards: Nominated for Best Continuing or Limited Series
 2011 National Cartoonist Society: Won Best Comic Book Artist (Jill Thompson)
 2011 Anthony Awards: Nominated for Best Graphic Novel
 2011 Eisner Awards: Nominated for Best Graphic Album - Reprint
 2011 Harvey Awards: Won for Best Graphic Album Previously Published
 2015 Eisner Awards: Won Best Single Issue/One-Shot (for Beasts of Burden: Hunters and Gatherers)
 2017 Eisner Awards: Won Best Painter/Multimedia Artist (Interior Art)
 2017 Eisner Awards: Won Best Single Issue/One-Shot (for Beasts of Burden: What the Cat Dragged In)

References

2003 comics debuts
Animal superheroes
Dark Horse Comics superheroes
Fantasy comics
Horror comics
Comics about dogs
Paranormal fiction